Coptolobus is a genus of beetles in the family Carabidae, containing the following species:

 Coptolobus anodon Chaudoir, 1879
 Coptolobus ater Andrewes, 1936
 Coptolobus glabriculus Chaudoir, 1857
 Coptolobus latus Andrewes, 1923
 Coptolobus lucens Banninger, 1935
 Coptolobus omodon Chaudoir, 1879

References

Scaritinae